Nonkhululeko Peaceful Thabethe (born 1 September 1992) is a South African cricketer who plays as a right-handed batter and right-arm medium bowler. She has appeared in one Test match, one One Day International and one Twenty20 International for South Africa, all against India in 2014. She earned her first cap in all three formats of international cricket in the space of fourteen days. She plays domestic cricket for Central Gauteng.

References

External links
 
 

Living people
1992 births
Cricketers from Johannesburg
South African women cricketers
South Africa women Test cricketers
South Africa women One Day International cricketers
South Africa women Twenty20 International cricketers
Central Gauteng women cricketers